KHC may refer to:
Kinesin heavy chain, a sub-component of kinesin proteins
Kingdom Holding Company, company based in Saudi Arabia
Kraft Heinz Company (stock ticker KHC)
KHC, the IATA code for Kerch Airport, Crimea, Ukraine